Ira Amond Fulton (born November 12, 1931) is an Arizona philanthropist, land developer, businessman, and founder of Fulton Homes. In 2006, BusinessWeek listed Fulton 36th on its list of "The 50 Most Generous Philanthropists.". The Arizona Legislature has also recognized his generosity.

According to BusinessWeek, Fulton and his wife, Mary Lou, had given away about $265 million, approximately 60% of their net worth as of 2005. Major recipients include Arizona State University (ASU), Brigham Young University (BYU), the University of Utah, Utah Valley University (UVU), the Huntsman Cancer Institute, and the Church of Jesus Christ of Latter-day Saints. A major donation project by Fulton for UVU happened in 2007, and in 2014 he pledged to donate $1 million towards BYU's new engineering building. In 2004 and 2005, the Fultons had donated $20 million to BYU to create 4 chairs named for Mary Lou Fulton. By October 2015, they had given $50 million to BYU, including $20 million donated in October 1999 to help the Lighting the Way Campaign reach a $400 million goal.

Several buildings or facilities at higher education institutions are named in honor of the Fultons.  These include ASU's Ira A. Fulton Schools of Engineering, BYU's Ira A. Fulton College of Engineering and Technology, ASU's Mary Lou Fulton College of Education, BYU's (Mary Lou) Fulton Supercomputing Lab, and UVU's Ira A. Fulton and Mary Lou Fulton Library.

Fulton was born in Tempe, Arizona. As a student at ASU, Fulton played football. Before becoming a real estate developer, Fulton owned a wide variety of businesses, including factories, insurance companies, auto parts stores, and tire stores. One of the most successful businesses was a men's clothing chain he owned from 1976 to 1995.

Fulton was one of Arizona's presidential electors in the 2004 election.

At BYU, Fulton has been a primary force behind formation of the BYU Center for Animation.

Fulton's wife, Mary Lou, died in October 2015.

Fulton Homes
Fulton Homes is a Tempe, Arizona-based homebuilder, founded by Fulton. The current CEO is Fulton's son, Douglas. Fulton Homes primarily builds mid-priced to high-end homes, with key competitors being Shea, Pulte, and Tri Pointe homebuilders.

References

External links
 Fulton Homes – Ira A. Fulton is the founder

1931 births
Latter Day Saints from Arizona
Living people
American philanthropists
Arizona State University alumni
Brigham Young University people
Arizona Republicans
2004 United States presidential electors
People from Tempe, Arizona